Josephine Serre was the first female dentist in Estonia.

In 1814 she became the first woman to receive a dentistry degree from the University of Tartu. Her daughter Marie-Louis Serre later graduated with a dentistry degree in 1829 from the same university.

References

Women dentists
19th-century dentists
19th-century Estonian women
Year of birth missing
Year of death missing